The 1947 International cricket season was from April 1947 to August 1947.

Season overview

May

Scotland in Ireland

June

South Africa in England

August

England in Netherlands

References

1947 in cricket